Phormosomatidae is a family of echinoderms belonging to the order Echinothurioida.

Genera:
 Hemiphormosoma Mortensen, 1934
 Paraphormosoma Mortensen, 1934
 Phormosoma Thomson, 1872

References

Echinothurioida
Echinoderm families